The Society of American Magicians (S.A.M.) is the oldest fraternal magic organization in the world. Its purpose is "to advance, elevate, and preserve magic as a performing art, to promote harmonious fellowship throughout the world of magic, and to maintain and improve ethical standards in the field of magic."  To promote these endeavors the S.A.M. presents awards and fellowships in recognition of outstanding achievement in the Art of Magic.

Membership in the S.A.M. is open to professional magicians, amateur magicians, youth magicians, magic collectors, magic historians, magic inventors, magic manufacturers and magic dealers. Over 30,000 people worldwide have been members, and currently the S.A.M. has 5,000 members worldwide. Despite the word "American" in the name, S.A.M. includes magicians from around the world. Its current National President, Rod Chow (2022–23), is Canadian.

History

Founded on May 10, 1902, in the back room of Martinka's magic shop in New York City, the Society expanded under the leadership of Harry Houdini during his term as National President from 1917–1926. Houdini sought to create a large, unified national network of professional and amateur magicians. Wherever he traveled, Houdini would give a lengthy formal address to the local magic club, making speeches, and usually threw a banquet for the members at his own expense.

For most of 1916, while on his vaudeville tour, Houdini, at his own expense, had been recruiting local magic clubs to join the SAM in an effort to revitalize what he felt was a weak organization.  Houdini persuaded groups in Buffalo, Detroit, Pittsburgh, and Kansas City to join. As had happened in London, Houdini persuaded magicians to join.  The Buffalo club joined as the first branch (later, an assembly) of the Society.  Chicago Assembly No. 3 was, as the name implies, the third regional club to be established by the S.A.M., whose assemblies now number in the hundreds. In 1917, he signed Assembly Number Three's charter, and that charter and this club continue to provide Chicago magicians with a connection to each other and to their past. Houdini dined with, addressed, and got pledges from similar clubs in Detroit, Rochester, Pittsburgh, Kansas City, Cincinnati and elsewhere. This was the biggest movement ever in the history of magic. In places where no clubs existed, he rounded up individual magicians, introduced them to each other, and urged them into the fold.  By the end of 1916, magicians' clubs in San Francisco and other cities that Houdini had not visited  were offering to become assemblies.  He had created the richest and longest surviving organization of magicians in the world.

The SAM now embraces over 5,000 members and almost 300 assemblies worldwide. In July, 1926, Houdini was elected for the ninth successive time President of the Society of American Magicians. Every other president has only served for one year. He also was President of the Magicians' Club of London.

Society of American Magicians Hall of Fame and Magic Museum, Los Angeles closed temporarily due to fire, contamination, and resultant litigation. After its disastrous fire, the museum's artifacts went on exhibit at the Whittier Museum for six months beginning in September 2012.

The organization pays tribute to Harry Houdini, with a broken wand ceremony on the anniversary of his death (by the Jewish calendar) at his grave in Machpelah Cemetery in Ridgewood, Queens, New York City.

The Society of Young Magicians
The Society of Young Magicians (SYM) is an organization devoted to assisting magicians, age seven through seventeen years. The Society of Young Magicians has clubs, known as "assemblies" located throughout the world; these assemblies are commonly jointly associated with an adult SAM assembly. When a member turns 18, they have the option to graduate to full membership in the Society of American Magicians.

The purpose of the Society of Young Magicians is to promote interest in magic as a hobby that develops skill and self-confidence, the ability to speak in public, discipline that comes from learning, practicing and performing magic and a sense of service to others through helping others learn magic and by performing magic at charitable events.

The Society of Young Magicians has nearly 100 local chapters, or assemblies, around the world. Adult members of the Society of American Magicians supervise and instruct members of the SYM.

Arlen Solomon is the SYM National Director. SYM's principal means of communication among its members is its e-zine, "The Magic SYMbol."

Conventions
The S.A.M. national convention is held annually, usually over the Fourth of July weekend.

Publications
 In September 1902, Mahatma became the official publication of S.A.M.
 In November 1902, The Sphinx became the 'Western Organ' of S.A.M.
 In March 1909, The Sphinx became the 'Official Organ' of S.A.M.
 In October 1911, S.A.M. started publishing M-U-M, a monthly print magazine originally published independently until July 1927. M-U-M stands for Magic, Unity, Might, a slogan of the S.A.M.
 October 1927–February 1942 and July 1947–June 1951, M-U-M was published as part of The Sphinx.
 March 1942–June 1947, M-U-M was published as part of Genii.
 In June 1951, M-U-M became an independently published magazine again. It is still in publication.

See also
 American Museum of Magic
 List of magic museums

References

External links
 

Arts organizations established in 1902
Magic museums
Magic organizations
1902 establishments in New York City